The Lola T500 is an open-wheel racing car chassis, designed, developed and built by Lola Cars, that competed in the CART open-wheel racing series, for competition in the 1978, 1979, and 1980 USAC Championship Car seasons. It was powered by the  Ford-Cosworth DFX. Only 5 models were produced. It won a total of 3 races, all in 1978, including the famous and prestigious 1978 Indianapolis 500, being driven by Al Unser.

References 

Open wheel racing cars
American Championship racing cars
Lola racing cars